Champange may refer to:

Séverine Champange-Gerfaux (b. 1978), French ski mountaineer

See also 
Champagne (disambiguation)
Champanges, a commune in southern France